The Lemos Building is a historic Craftsman Fairy tale commercial building in downtown Carmel-by-the-Sea, California. It was built in 1929, by Louis Anderson, based on master builder Hugh W. Comstock's adjacent Tuck Box design. The building was designated as a significant commercial building in the city's Downtown Historic District Property Survey, and was recorded with the Department of Parks and Recreation on October 8, 2002. The Lemos Building continues today as the Carmel Groomers Pet Salon.

History
Pedro J. Lemos (1882-1954), director of Stanford Museum and Art Galleries, bought the Art Shop (later called Tuck Box and adjacent property from Ray C. De Yoe in 1927. The space became known as the "Early Bird" and Lemos's vision was to fill it with unique shops and studios reminiscent of medieval shops in the "old world cities."

In April 1929, Lemos designed a fairy-tale cottage for himself, based on Hugh W. Comstock's Tuck Box design, in the rear of the property, that Louis Anderson built for $1,000, called the Lemos Building, or Garden Shop. Anderson had worked on other Lemos projects in the San Francisco Bay Area. The Garden Shop sold flowers, plants, and garden tools. The shop later became known as the "Tuck Box Jam Shop."

The Lemos Building is a one-and-one-half-story, steep pitched gabled shingled roof, wood-framed Fairy tale Craftsman style commercial building in Carmel-by-the-Sea, California. The exterior walls are rough textured stucco with exposed faux-timber frame posts and horizontal beams. There is a large window that copies the roof line looks down at the patio below. The front entrance is through a courtyard that it shares with the Tuck Box. A Dutch door, artwork, and Carmel stone is used along the front and porch entrance steps. A decorative oval sign hangs beneath the eves with the words "The Garden Shop Carmel."

In November 1931, Lemos built a separate addition to the Garden Shop that was constructed by Hugh Comstock for $475. It is known as the Garden Shop Addition and is between the Tuck Box and the El Paseo Building. When it first opened it sold cut flowers, gift plants, and pottery.

In 1932, the Tuck Box was the Tyler Book Shop that sold new and old books, some of which were displayed in the three-sided bay window. To the right of the shop was the Blue Bird Tea Garden, and the Garden Shop Addition had a sign that said "The Garden Shop Flowers Plants Pottery."

In 1957, owners of the Tuck Box, purchased the Lemos building and renamed it the "Tuck Box Gift Shop." It was stocked with imports of linens, china, jewelry and pottery. The Tuck Box Gift Shop continued as a successful business until it was closed in November 1996.

The Lemos Building qualifies for inclusion in the Downtown Historic District Property Survey as the only building designed by artist Pedro J. Lemos, who was president of the Carmel Art Association and one of the teachers of the Carmel Arts and Crafts Club. It is an example of a Storybook style commercial building designed by Lemos based on Hugh Comstock's Fairy-Tail style, and built by Louis Anderson in 1929. The Lemos Building, Garden Shop Addition, and Tuck Box are internationally associated with the city of Carme-by-the-Sea.

Gallery

See also
 The Tuck Box
 Garden Shop Addition

References

External links

 Downtown Conservation District Historic Property Survey
 Carmel Groomers Pet Salon
 A Great Place In Carmel-by-the-Sea

1929 establishments in California
Carmel-by-the-Sea, California
Buildings and structures in Monterey County, California